Ostřetice is a municipality and village in Klatovy District in the Plzeň Region of the Czech Republic. It has about 70 inhabitants. The historic centre of the village is well preserved and is protected by law as a village monument zone.

Administrative parts
The village of Makalovy is an administrative part of Ostřetice.

Gallery

References

Villages in Klatovy District